Tony Marchant may refer to:

Tony Marchant (cyclist) (born 1937), former Australian Olympic track cyclist
Tony Marchant (playwright) (born 1959), British playwright and television dramatist
Tony Marchant (rugby league), rugby league footballer of the 1980s and 1990s for Great Britain, Castleford, and Dewsbury